The 1993–94 Belarusian Cup was the third season of the annual Belarusian football cup competition. It began on 3 July 1993 with the first of five rounds and ended on 24 June 1994 with the final at the Dinamo Stadium in Minsk.

FC Neman Grodno were the defending champions, having defeated FC Vedrich Rechitsa in the 1993 final, but were knocked out in the first round by Albertin Slonim.

FC Dinamo Minsk won the final against FC Fandok Bobruisk to win their second title.

Round of 32
The games were played on 3 July 1993.

|}

Round of 16
The games were played on 7 July 1993.

|}

Quarterfinals 
The first legs were played on 11 July 1993 and the second legs were played on 2 and 8 August 1993.

|}

Semifinals 
The first legs were played on 6 October 1993 and the second legs were played on 28 October 1993.

|}

Final
The final match was played on 24 June 1994 at the Dinamo Stadium in Minsk.

External links
 RSSSF

Belarusian Cup seasons
Belarusian Cup
Cup
Cup